Laboral Kutxa–Fundación Euskadi is a Spanish women's road bicycle racing team, established in 2019, which participates in elite women's races.

National champions
2021
 Spain Track (Omnium), Eukene Larrarte
 Spain Track (Madison), Tania Calvo
 Spain Track (Madison), Eukene Larrarte
 Spain Track (Individual pursuit), Tania Calvo
 Spain Track (Elimination race), Eukene Larrarte
 Spain Track (Scratch race), Tania Calvo
2022
 Spain Track (Omnium), Tania Calvo
 Spain Track (Madison), Tania Calvo

References

External links

UCI Women's Teams
Cycling teams based in Spain
Cycling teams established in 2019